A Little Good News may refer to:

 "A Little Good News" (song)
 A Little Good News (album)